Niger is governed through a four layer, semi-decentralised series of Administrative divisions. Begun 1992, and finally approved with the formation of the Fifth Republic of Niger on 18 July 1999, Niger has been enacting a plan for Decentralisation of some state powers to local bodies. Prior to the 1999-2006 project, Niger's subdivisions were administered via direct appointment from the central government in Niamey.  Beginning with Niger's first municipal elections of 2 February 1999, the nation started electing local officials for the first time.  Citizens now elect local committee representatives in each Commune, chosen by subdivisions of the commune: "Quarters" in towns and "Villages" in rural areas, with additional groupings for traditional polities and nomadic populations.  These officials choose Mayors, and from them are drawn representatives to the Department level.  The Departmental council, Prefect, and representatives to the Regional level are chosen here using the same procedure. The system is repeated a Regional level, with a Regional Prefect, council, and representatives to the High Council of Territorial Collectives (Le Haut Conseil des Collectivités Territoriales HCCT). The HCCT has only advisory powers, but its members (Regions, Departments, and Communes) have some financial, planning, educational and environmental powers.  The central government oversees this process through the office of the Minister of State for the Interior, Public Safety and Decentralization.

Current administrative structure
Niger is divided into 7 Regions (French: régions; singular – région). Each region's capital is the same as its name. Additionally, the national capital, Niamey, comprises a capital district.

Regions of Niger
Agadez Region
Diffa Region
Dosso Region
Maradi Region
Tahoua Region
Tillabéri Region
Zinder Region

The Regions are subdivided into Departments and communes. As of 2005, there were 36 départements, divided into 265 communes, 122 cantons and 81 groupements. The latter two categories cover all areas not covered by Urban Communes (population over 10000) or Rural Communes (population under 10000), and are governed by the Department, whereas Communes have (since 1999) elected councils and mayors.  Additional semi-autonomous sub-divisions include Sultanates, Provinces and Tributaries (tribus).  The Nigerien government estimates there are an additional 17000 Villages administered by Rural Communes, while there are a number of Quartiers (boroughs  or neighborhoods) administered by Urban Communes.

Restructuring
Prior to the devolution program on 1999–2006, these Regions were styled Departments.  Confusingly, the next level down (Arrondissements) were renamed Departments.

1992 division
Tillabéri department was created in 1992, when Niamey Region (then called "department") was split, with the area immediately outside Niamey renamed as the  capital district.

Historical evolution
Prior to independence, Niger was divided into sixteen Cercles as second level administration divisions: Agadez, Birni N'Konni, Dogondoutchi, Dosso, Filingué, Gouré, Madaoua, Magaria, Maradi, N'Guigmi, Niamey, Tahoua, Téra, Tessaoua, Tillabéry, and Zinder. Their capitals had the same names as the cercle.

After independence, the 31 December 1961 Law of territorial organization created 31 circonscriptions. The 16 colonial cercles continued to exist, and served as a level of division above these circonscriptions. Four cercles (Dogondoutchi, Filingué, N'Guigmi, and Téra) had only one circonscription. The Law of August 14, 1964 then reorganized the country into seven departments, adopting the French second level administration naming system, in contrast to neighbor Mali, which retained the colonial Cercles and Regions.

See also
Regions of Niger
Departments of Niger
Communes of Niger
List of FIPS region codes (M-O) for the department codes under the FIPS 10-4 standard.

References

 
Niger
Government of Niger
Decentralization